is a 2014 role-playing video game developed by Nihon Falcom. The game is a part of the Trails series, itself a part of the larger The Legend of Heroes series, and serves as a direct sequel to The Legend of Heroes: Trails of Cold Steel. 

It was first released in Japan for the PlayStation 3 and PlayStation Vita before being localized into English by Xseed Games in 2016. A Windows port by Xseed was released in February 2018, while a remastered version for the PlayStation 4 was released in Japan in April 2018 and worldwide in June 2019. A port for Nintendo Switch was released in Asia in 2021. A direct sequel, The Legend of Heroes: Trails of Cold Steel III, was released in late 2017.

Gameplay
The gameplay of Trails of Cold Steel II is similar to the first Trails of Cold Steel game, being a traditional Japanese role-playing video game with turn-based battles. Game progression is no longer tied to the school schedule structure of the original, with the game now centered around traveling the world rather than attending classes. If the player has a completed game save file from the prior game, it has an effect in Cold Steel II, with certain events and dialogues playing out differently based on choices and relationships built in the first game.

Plot
Beginning one month after the original Trails of Cold Steel, the game's events take place largely concurrently with the final chapter of Trails to Azure. Rean Schwarzer wakes from a month-long coma he fell into after unwillingly escaping from Trista at the end of the previous game. He makes it to his hometown of Ymir with the assistance of bracer Toval Randonneur, but Rean quickly finds him and his loved ones caught in the crossfire of the war. Rean's opponents are the Noble Alliance, which has partnered with the Imperial Liberation Front from the previous game, as well as Ouroboros - a recurring group of antagonists in the Trails series. Students from Thors Military Academy, including those from Class VII, have been scattered across the country, so Rean resolves to find his classmates, put an end to the civil war, and save those he cares about. 

After Rean gathers the scattered students, resolving conflicts across eastern Erebonia while doing so, he leads them in liberating Thors from the Noble Alliance. During their journey, they find many parallels between the modern civil war and the War of the Lions, a civil war took place 250 years ago in Erebonia and was put to an end by the former Awakener of Valimar, Dreichels the Lionheart. The members of Class VII attack the Erebonian capital of Heimdallr to stop the Noble Alliance and end the war. They succeed, but at the cost of the life of Crow Armbrust, former member of Class VII and leader of the Imperial Liberation Front who defects from the Alliance to save the Erebonia's Crown Prince Cedric from the Divine Knight Testa-Rossa, which had been cursed and corrupted into becoming a monster called the Vermillion Apocalypse. Chancellor Osborne, believed to have been assassinated by Crow at the start of the war, arrives to seize control of the situation. He reveals his intent to take over Ouroboros's "Phantasmal Blaze Plan", annex Crossbell State, and that he is Rean's biological father. After the war, the Noble Faction's power is diminished while Chancellor's is expanded.

Before the end of the school year, the members of Class VII over come one final trial in the old schoolhouse. At the end of their first year, all of Class VII's members except Rean choose to graduate from Thors early, and they make a vow to improve in their respective specialties and face the impending turbulent times together.

Development and release
Trails of Cold Steel II uses the PhyreEngine game engine. Trails of Cold Steel II was first released in Japan on September 25, 2014, for PlayStation 3 and PlayStation Vita. The game was localized into English by Xseed Games. Work on translating the game began in February 2015, with around 1.45 million characters to be translated. Translation took about a year, being about 95% complete by January 2016. Xseed added approximately 11,000 lines of English dialogue for its English release. The game was released for PS3 and Vita in North America on September 6, 2016, and in Europe on November 11. A port for Windows was released worldwide on February 14, 2018. This version features various enhancements such as support for 4K resolution, various graphical enhancements, and additional English voice acting.

A remastered version for the PlayStation 4, The Legend of Heroes: Trails of Cold Steel II: Kai, was released in Japan on April 26, 2018, and in North America and Europe in June 2019. A port for the Nintendo Switch, developed and published by Clouded Leopard Entertainment was released in Japan and Asia on August 5, 2021.

Reception

The Legend of Heroes: Trails of Cold Steel II received "generally favorable" reviews according to review aggregator Metacritic. Famitsu gave the PS3 and PS Vita versions of the game a score of 31/40. Chris Shrive of Hardcore Gamer strongly praised the game for being "a modern JRPG masterpiece" with "the perfect blend of the classic JRPG formula mixed with contemporary features" concluding that "the emphasis on story telling and immense cast of memorable characters make the large time commitment worthwhile". Kimberly Wallace of Game Informer was similarly positive about the game's story and characters, but complained of the game's dull dungeons design. Despite the shortcomings, she still felt that the game "takes the cast and story in such interesting directions and provides so much to do that it’s hard to put down...[the game] makes me care so much about the characters and the world that it becomes easier to look past its flaws". Darren McPhail of RPGSite was similarly positive about the game stating "For fans of the previous Legend of Heroes games and especially the first Trails of Cold Steel, picking up Trails of Cold Steel 2 is a no-brainer easy recommendation. While this sequel is unevenly paced and lacks shocking plot twists until the conclusion, the Trails of Cold Steel games are some of the best of the genre and well worth a look for most hardcore RPG fans". All three reviewers agreed that, while it was possible to enjoy the game's story as a stand-alone experience, the story was better for people who had played the original Trails of Cold Steel first, due to their direct ties to one another.

Sales
In Japan, the game sold 86,283 physical retail copies on the PlayStation Vita and 65,498 retail copies on the PlayStation 3 within its debut release week. Within that week, the Vita version placed second among all software sales in Japan, while the PS3 version placed fifth. The PlayStation 4 version sold 11,345 copies during its first week on sale in Japan, placing it at number ten on the all format sales chart.

Notes

References

External links
 

2014 video games
Fiction about invasions
Japanese role-playing video games
Nihon Falcom games
Nintendo Switch games
PhyreEngine games
PlayStation 3 games
PlayStation 4 games
PlayStation Vita games
Politics in fiction
Role-playing video games
Single-player video games
The Legend of Heroes
Trails (series)
Video game sequels
Video games about mecha
Video games developed in Japan
War video games
Windows games
Xseed Games games